Erikdere is a village in the Kâhta District, Adıyaman Province, Turkey. The village is populated by Kurds of the Reşwan tribe and had a population of 359 in 2021.

The hamlets of Tekeli and Uncular are attached to Erikdere.

References

Villages in Kâhta District
Kurdish settlements in Adıyaman Province